Reuter's blind snake (Madatyphlops reuteri), also known commonly as Reuter's worm snake, is a species of snake in the family Typhlopidae.

Etymology
The specific name, reuteri, is in honor of "C. Reuter" who collected the holotype.

Geographic range
M. reuteri is endemic to the Madagascan island Nosy Be.

Reproduction
M. reuteri is oviparous.

References

Further reading
Boettger, O[skar] (1881). "Diagnoses Reptilium et Batrachiorum Novorum insulae Nossi-Bé Madagascariensis ". Zoologische Anzeiger 4: 650–651. (Typhlops reuteri, new species, p. 650). (in Latin).
Nagy, Zoltán; Marion, Angela B.; Glaw, Frank; Miralles, Aurélien; Nopper, Joachim; Vences, Miguel; Hedges, S. Blair (2015). "Molecular systematics and undescribed diversity of Madagascan scolecophidian snakes (Squamata: Serpentes)". Zootaxa 4040 (1): 31–47.

Madatyphlops
Reptiles described in 1881